Nesslau-Neu St. Johann railway station is a railway station in Nesslau, in the Swiss canton of St. Gallen. It is the souther terminus of the Bodensee–Toggenburg railway and is served by local trains only.

Services 
Nesslau-Neu St. Johann is served by the S2 of the St. Gallen S-Bahn:

 : hourly service over the Bodensee–Toggenburg railway to Altstätten SG.

References

External links 
 
 Nesslau-Neu St. Johann station on SBB

Railway stations in the canton of St. Gallen
Südostbahn stations